Zalalövő is a town in Zala County, Hungary.

Twin towns — sister cities
Zalalövő is twinned with:

  Oberaich, Austria 
  Chibed, Romania 
  Savignano sul Panaro, Italy

References

External links 

 Street map 

Populated places in Zala County